Agudas Israel (Hebrew for "Union of Israel") was a political party in Latvia in the inter-war period. Primarily a party of the Orthodox Jews, it was the most conservative of the Jewish parties in the country, seeking to limit the power of state monopolies. It was led by Mordehai Dubin.

History
The party first contested national elections in 1922, when it won two seats in the 1st Saeima. It retained both seats in the 2nd Saeima after the 1925 elections, but was reduced to one seat in the 1928 elections. The 1931 elections saw the party win two seats in the 4th Saeima. However, after the 1934 Latvian coup d'état multi-party elections were not held again until 1990.

See also
History of the Jews in Latvia
Ceire Cion

References

Defunct political parties in Latvia
Jews and Judaism in Latvia
Jewish Latvian history
Political parties of minorities in Latvia
Jewish political parties
Agudat Yisrael